The 2020 Oregon wildfire season was one of the most destructive on record in the state of Oregon. The season is a part of the 2020 Western United States wildfire season.

Timeline
The Oregon Department of Forestry declared fire season beginning on July 5, 2020, signaling the end of unregulated debris burning outdoors.

In early September, unusually high winds and continued dry weather caused the rapid expansion of multiple wildfires in Oregon. Over 1,000,000 acres were burned, and about 40,000 people were evacuated, with about 500,000 people in evacuation warning areas. The cities of Phoenix, Talent, Detroit, and Gates in Oregon were substantially destroyed by the Almeda Drive and Santiam Fires respectively. State-wide, at least 7 people have been killed. In the Almeda Fire area — between Ashland, Talent, and Phoenix — more than 2,800 structures were destroyed. Around the South Obenchain Fire, which stretched from Shady Cove nearly to Butte Falls, 153 structures were lost. Sheriff Sickler said that these numbers do not differentiate between homes, businesses, outbuildings, and other structures. Assessing the precise nature of those structures lost will fall to local teams in the days and weeks ahead. Officials stated that the Almeda Drive Fire was human-caused. On September 11, a man was arrested for arson, for allegedly starting a fire that destroyed multiple homes in Phoenix and merged with the Almeda Drive Fire. A separate criminal investigation into the origin point of the Almeda Drive Fire in Ashland is ongoing.

Causes

Through the end of July 2020, 90% of Oregon's wildfires had been caused by humans versus a yearly average of 70%, possibly because of increased outdoor recreation due to the COVID-19 pandemic.

Rumors and theories
Rumors spread on social media that antifa activists were deliberately setting fires and preparing to loot property that was being evacuated. Some residents refused to evacuate based on the rumors, choosing to defend their homes from the alleged invasion. Authorities pleaded with residents to ignore the rumors. One Facebook post shared thousands of times falsely stated, "KXL Radio in Portland reported today that Firefighters are now being shot at by suspected Antifa and BLM members." QAnon followers participated in the misinformation, with one false claim that six antifa activists had been arrested for setting fires amplified by Q specifically. There were also rumors that members of far-right groups had started some of the fires, though authorities labeled the claims as false, saying that people needed to question claims that they found on social media.

Senator Jeff Merkley, (D-OR) decried Donald Trump's comments blaming forest management for the fires as a "devastating lie.” Speaking on This Week with George Stephanopoulos, Merkley blamed climate change for the fires.

One of the major fires, the Almeda fire in Southern Oregon, was worsened by a second blaze that was allegedly the result of arson. The first origin point of the fire is still under active investigation, and arson is suspected there, as well.

Several small brush fires in Portland that were quickly put out were also the result of arson by a suspect who was apprehended, released, and then started several more.

List of wildfires 
 
The following is a list of fires that burned more than 1,000 acres, or produced significant structural damage or loss of life.

See also

 August 2020 California lightning wildfires
 2020 Western United States wildfires
 Western US wildfire trends

References

External links